Early is both a surname and a given name. Notable people with the name include:

Surname:

Alan Early, Irish writer
Biddy Early (1798–1874), Irish herbalist
Cleanthony Early (born 1991), American basketball player
David Early (1938–2013), American actor
Gerald Early (born 1952), American writer, culture critic and professor
James M. Early (1922–2004), American electrical engineer for whom the Early effect was named
John Early (disambiguation)
Joseph D. Early (1933–2012), U.S. Congressman from Massachusetts
Jubal Anderson Early (1816–1894), American Civil War general
Margaret Early (1919–2000), American actress
Peter Early (1773–1817), American politician
Stephen Early (1889–1951), White House Press Secretary (1933–1945, 1950)
Steve Early (born 1956), American boxer

Given name:
Early Doucet (born 1985), American football wide receiver 
Early Wynn (1920–1999), American baseball pitcher

Fictional characters:
Early Grayce, a sociopathic parolee in the film Kalifornia
Jubal Early, a fictional bounty hunter in the television series Firefly
Early Cuyler, the father character on the cartoon show Squidbillies